Eri Hozumi and Makoto Ninomiya were the defending champions, but Hozumi chose to participate in Canberra instead. Ninomiya partnered Shuko Aoyama and successfully defended her title, they defeated Chinese wildcards Lu Jingjing and Zhang Yuxuan in the final, 6–3, 6–0.

Seeds

Draw

References 
 Draw

Blossom Cup - Doubles
Industrial Bank Cup